Flying Pat is a 1920 American silent comedy film starring Dorothy Gish and her then husband James Rennie that was directed by F. Richard Jones. It was produced by Famous Players-Lasky and distributed by Paramount Pictures.

The film is preserved in the Cinémathèque Française.

Plot
As described in a film magazine, young bride Patricia Van Nuys (Gish), whose husband Robert (Rennie) desires that she carve out a career rather than bother her pretty head about domestic chores, is given lessons in flying by William Endicott (Wallace). Her experiences as a pupil land them both on the ground in a nose dive wreck from which they miraculously emerge and seek refreshment in a nearby roadhouse. Her husband arrives on the scene just as her instructor is proving to be an affectionate and entertaining companion. His ire drives her out of the home and on the night train to Albany. Rid of her money in a poker game, she returns and meets an emergency by posing as a cook in her own home. One complication leads to another until they terminate in the reconciliation of the couple.

Cast

Release
Flying Pat was released in the United States on November 11, 1920. It was still circulating in 1922, screening at the Empress Theatre in Mangum, Oklahoma, on February 24 and 25, and at the Royal Theatre in Guymon on Saturday, March 4. A week after that, it played Tulsa.

The film first screened in New Zealand at the Paramount and Artcraft Theatres on June 3, 1921, on a double bill with the dramatic feature The Inside of the Cup. The film played at those theaters through at least June 8. It was second feature to Cecil B. deMille's Something to Think About when it screened at Wellington's Princess Theatre on December 9 of that year. It premiered in Whangārei the following month.

Note
In her 1969 autobiography, The Movies Mr. Griffith and Me, Lillian Gish includes a still from this movie identifying James Rennie, Dorothy Gish, and an unknown player. The unknown player is actor Morgan Wallace.

References

External links

Lobby poster(WaybackMachine)

1920 films
American silent feature films
Films directed by F. Richard Jones
Paramount Pictures films
1920 comedy films
Silent American comedy films
American black-and-white films
1920s American films